The French post offices in Crete were among a collection of post offices maintained by foreign countries during the late 1800s/early 1900s, after Crete had broken away from the Ottoman Empire, and until 1914 after Crete united with Greece in 1913. The offices were in [[Chania] LA CANEE Rethymnon RETHYMNO Heraklion CANDIE Sitia SITIA Ierapetra HIERAPETRA and Agios Nikolaos SAN NICOLO; the last three were already closed end of 1899

France issued postage stamps for its offices in Crete in 1902 and 1903. The first set included 15 values, from one centime to five francs, consisting of the design of the French stamps of 1900, modified to be inscribed "CRETE". This was only a partial solution, since the local currency was still in piastres, and so in 1903 the post offices issued five of the larger values surcharged with values from one to twenty piastres.

References

Sources 

 Stanley Gibbons Ltd: various catalogues
 AskPhil – Glossary of Stamp Collecting Terms
 Encyclopaedia of Postal History
Rossiter, Stuart & John Flower. The Stamp Atlas. London: Macdonald, 1986. 

Postage stamps of France
Cretan State
Philately of Greece
Establishments in the Cretan State